Schloss Grosssölk is a castle in Styria, Austria. Schloss Grosssölk is situated at an elevation of 932 m.

See also
List of castles in Austria

References

This article was initially translated from the German Wikipedia.

Castles in Styria